Giacinto Morera (18 July 1856 – 8 February 1909), was an Italian engineer and mathematician.  He is known for Morera's theorem in the theory of functions of a complex variable and for his work in the theory of linear elasticity.

Biography

Life
He was born in Novara on 18 July 1856, the son of Giacomo Morera and Vittoria Unico. This occurrence eased him in his studies after the laurea: however, he was an extraordinarily hard worker and he widely used this ability in his researches. After studying in Turin he went to Pavia, Pisa and Leipzig: then he went back to Pavia for a brief period in 1885, and finally he went to Genova in 1886, living here for the next 15 years. While being in Genova he married his fellow-citizen Cesira Faà. From 1901 on to his death he worked in Turin: he died of pneumonia on 8 February 1909.

Education and academic career

In Turin he attended the courses held by Enrico d'Ovidio, Angelo Genocchi and particularly the ones held by Francesco Siacci: later in his life, Morera acknowledged Siacci as his mentor in scientific research and life. After graduating, he followed several advanced courses: he studied in Pavia from 1881 to 1882 under Eugenio Beltrami, Eugenio Bertini and Felice Casorati. In 1883 he was in Pisa under Enrico Betti, Riccardo de Paolis and Ulisse Dini: a year later, he was in Leipzig under Felix Klein, Adolph Mayer and Carl Neumann. In 1885 he went in Berlin in order to follow the lessons of Hermann von Helmholtz, Gustav Kirchhoff, Leopold Kronecker and Karl Weierstrass at the local university: later in the same year, he went back to Italy, briefly working at the University of Pavia as a professor in the then newly established "Scuola di Magistero". In 1886, after passing the required competitive examination by a judging commission, he became professor of rational mechanics at the University of Genova: he lived there for 15 years, serving also as dean and as rector. In 1901 he was called by the University of Turin to hold the chair of rational mechanics, left vacant by Vito Volterra. In 1908 he passed to the chair of "Meccanica Superiore" and was elected dean of the Faculty of Sciences.

Honours
He was member of the Accademia Nazionale dei Lincei (first elected corresponding member on 18 July 1896, then elected national member on 26 August 1907) and of the Accademia delle Scienze di Torino (elected on 9 February 1902).  refers that also the Kharkov Mathematical Society elected him corresponding member during the meeting of the society held on 31 October 1909 (Old Calendar), being apparently not aware of his death.

Tracts of his personality and attitudes

In his commemorative papers, Carlo Somigliana describes extensively Morera's personality: according to him, he was a devoted friend and precious colleague, capable of serenely judging men and facts. On the very personal level, he remembers him s a cheerful person and a witty talker.

His intelligence is described as sharp and penetrating, his mind as uncommonly lucid, himself as possessing analytic and critical abilities and being versatile, capable to grasp and appreciate every kind of manifestation of the human intellect. Nevertheless, Somigliana also states that he was not interested in any scientific or other kind of field outside of his own realm of expertise.  himself, in the inaugural address as the rector of the University of Genova, after quoting a statement attributed to Peter Guthrie Tait, revealed the reason behind his views: "In science, the one who has a sound and solid knowledge, even in a narrow field, holds a true strength and he can use it whenever he needs: the one who has only a superficial knowledge, however wide and striking, holds nothing, and indeed he often holds a weakness pushing him towards vanity".

Acknowledged as honest, loyal and conscientious, good-tempered and with a good intellect, his simple manners earned him affection even when performing the duties of dean and rector at the University of Genoa. Also  describes him as a man of high moral value, and ascribes to such qualities the reason of his success in social relations and in performing his duties as a civil servant.

However, despite of being successful in social relations, he did not cured nor appreciated much appearances and was not interested in activities other than teaching and doing research: consequently, he was not well known outside the circle of his family and relatives and the circle of his colleagues. He did not make a display of himself, careless of being not acknowledged by everyone for his true value: he also had a serious conception of life and strongly disliked vanity and superficiality.

According to Somigliana, his entire life was devoted to the higher unselfish ideal of scientific research: and  also remarks that only his beloved family shared the same attentions and cares he reserved to his lifelong ideal.

Work

Research activity

According to Somigliana, he was not particularly inventive: he did not create any new theory since this was not his main ability. Instead, he perfected already developed theories: nearly all of his researches appear as the natural result of a deep analysis work on theories that have already reached a high degree of perfection, clearly and precisely exposed. He had an exquisite sense for the applicability of his work, derived from his engineering studies, and mastered perfectly all known branches of mathematical analysis and their mechanical and physical applications.

In particular  classifies Morera's work by assigning each publication to particular research field: this classification is basically adopted in the following subsections.

Complex analysis

Morera wrote eight research works on complex analysis: the style he used for their writing probably inspired Somigliana the quotation introducing the "Research activity" section. Morera's theorem, probably the best known part of his scientific research, was first proved in the paper . The theorem states that if, in the complex plane , the line integral of a given continuous complex–valued function  satisfies the equation

for every closed curve  in a given domain , then  is holomorphic there.

Differential equations
This section includes all his works on the theory of differential equations, ordinary or partial ones:  classifies this contributions as works in the theory of the equations of dynamics, in the theory of first-order partial differential equations and in the theory of exact differential equations. In the paper  he gives a very brief proof of a transformation formula for the Poisson brackets first proved by Émile Léonard Mathieu, while in the paper  he simplifies the proof of a theorem of Francesco Siacci which is substantially equivalent to Lie's third theorem: the paper  is concerned with the Pfaff problem, proving a theorem on the minimum number of integrations to be performed in order to solve the problem.

Equilibrium of continuous bodies in elasticity theory
The works within this section are perhaps the second best known part of his research, after his contributions to complex analysis.

Mathematical analysis
 classifies four of his works under the locution "Questioni varie di Analisi".

Potential theory of harmonic functions
His contribution of this topics are classified by  under two sections, named respectively "Fondamenti della teoria della funzione potenziale" and "Attrazione dell'elissoide e funzioni armoniche ellissoidali". The work  deals with the definition and properties of ellipsoidal harmonics and the related Lamé functions.

Rational mechanics and mathematical physics
 includes in this class twelve works: his first published work  is included among them.

Varia: algebraic analysis and differential geometry

Teaching activity
References ,  and  do not say much about the teaching activity of Giacinto Morera: Somigliana describes once his teaching ability as incisive. However, his teaching is also testified by the lithographed lecture notes : according to the OPAC , this book had two editions, the first one being in 1901–1902.

Publications

. Morera's first published paper, probably including material from his laurea thesis in mathematics.
.
.
. This paper was read by Enrico D'Ovidio at the meeting of the Class of Mathematical, Natural and Physical Sciences of the Accademia delle scienze di Torino, while  finished it on the February 1883 in Pisa, according to the date reported on the last page of the paper.
. This paper was read by Francesco Siacci at the meeting of the Class of Mathematical, Natural and Physical Sciences of the Accademia delle scienze di Torino, while  finished it on 15 April 1883 in Pisa, according to the date reported on the last page of the paper.
. Morera's unique paper in differential geometry.
: the paper containing the first proof of Morera's theorem.
.
 (requires DjVu plu-gin): a paper containing the studies of Morera on the boundary values of the Cauchy integral.
. The inaugural address pronounced in occasion of the beginning of the academic year 1888–1889 at the University of Genoa, published in the form of a pamphlet.
. A paper containing a short proof of Stokes' formula in the plane. 
.
.
. Part II was read at the meeting of the Class of Mathematical, Natural and Physical Sciences of the Accademia delle scienze di Torino held a few weeks later, on 11 March 1906: see here for a brief description of the meeting, and here to access part II of the paper directly.

See also 
Linear elasticity
Morera's theorem
Potential theory
Morera stress functions

Notes

References

Biographical references
The references listed in this section contain mainly biographical information on the life of Giacinto Morera.
. The "Yearbook" of the renowned Italian scientific institution, including an historical sketch of its history, the list of all past and present members as well as a wealth of informations about its academic and scientific activities.
.
. A collection of biographical notes on Italian mathematicians who worked in Italy from 1861 up to 1960. Its content is available from the website of the Società Italiana di Storia delle Matematiche.

General references
The references listed in this section are mainly commemorations or surveys giving information on the life or Morera but also describing his scientific researches in some detail.
. "The Italian contribution to the mathematical theory of elasticity" is a survey paper describing the Italian contributions to the field of elasticity, including brief sketches of the biographies of the main scientists involved.
. This paper is the Italian translation by the author of an original commemorative paper written in Russian, published in the "Communications de la Societé Mathématique de Kharkoff" as 
.
.
.

Scientific references
The references listed in this section describe particular aspect of Morera's scientific work or survey his scientific contribution to a given field.
.
 .
.
 (reviews of the first 1953 English edition).
.

External links 
.

1856 births
1909 deaths
19th-century Italian mathematicians
20th-century Italian mathematicians
Deaths from pneumonia in Piedmont
Engineers from Genoa
Complex analysts
Mathematical analysts
Mathematical physicists
People from Novara
Engineers from Turin